Benedetto Giovannelli (1602–1676) was an architect from Siena.

He was commissioned in 1660 by Pope Alexander VII (a Chigi) to build a new marble façade for the church of San Raimondo, which is in three classicist-style superimposed orders.

He was one of a group of architects (the others being Damiano Schifandini, Flaminio del Turco, Giovanni Fontana) who produced buildings marked by a harmonious, measured style.

References

17th-century Italian architects
Italian Baroque architects
Architects from Tuscany
1602 births
1676 deaths